The Al-Shamal Islamic Bank of Khartoum, founded in 1983, is one of the major financial institutions of Sudan, and one of the leading Islamic banks worldwide. The bank changed its brand to Balad Bank the 3rd of August 2018.

Shareholders 
According to public records, among the investors in the Al Shamal Islamic Bank include a Geneva-based financial services conglomerate headed by Mohammed al Faisal, son of the late King Faisal.

The bank itself that among its five "main founders" and principal shareholders is another Khartoum bank, the Faisal Islamic Bank of Sudan.  According to public records, 19 percent of the Faisal Islamic Bank is owned by the Dar Al-Maal Al-Islami Trust, or simply DMI Trust, also headed by Prince Faisal.  The $3.5 billion DMI Trust, whose slogan is "Allah is the purveyor of success," was founded in 1981 to foster the spread of Islamic banking across the Muslim world. Its 12-member board of directors includes Haydar Mohamed Bin Laden, a half-brother of Osama bin Laden, according to a DMI spokesman.

Other shareholders include:
 Adel Batterjee, also chairman as recently as 2002.
 Al Baraka Investment and Development Corporation

See also

List of banks
List of banks in Sudan

References

External links 
 CooperativeResearch link on Al-Shamal Islamic Bank
 Mbendi profile

Banks of Sudan
Islamic banks
Banks established in 1983
1983 establishments in Sudan
Companies based in Khartoum